Birth of America is a wargame by SEP BOA, a development team at AGEOD.

Gameplay
In Birth of America, the player controls one of the major contenders of the French and Indian War or the American War of Independence, trying to achieve military and political victory.

The scope of the game covers all of North America, from Florida to Quebec and New England to Mississippi, from 1755 to 1783. The game map is divided into more than 700 provinces, with a great diversity of terrain, climates and civilization levels.

There are two nations fighting each other in all of the game's ten scenarios. Game turns correspond to one month of historical time. Scenarios vary from a few months to almost 9 years. Players control mostly the military action of their nation. This includes such activities as drafting forces, building forts and depots, sieges and blockades, raiding enemy settlements and battles, both on land and at sea.

Birth of America has two wars, the French and Indian War and the American Revolution. The object of the game is to attack and capture objectives, strategic towns, and manage strategies in order to win battles thus gaining edge. Real political events, such as the battle of Bunker Hill and the signing of the Declaration of Independence, will also influence the outcome of morale throughout the game.

Reception

The game received "average" reviews according to the review aggregation website Metacritic. Over four months before the game was released for retail in Europe, PC Gamer UK gave it a review and commented that it "captures the unique character of American Revolutionary warfare without drowning wannabe Washingtons and Howes in detail." GameSpot lamented that "it doesn't do quite enough to broaden the genre's appeal to newcomers."

The editors of Computer Games Magazine presented Birth of America with their 2006 "Best Wargame" award.

References

External links
 

2006 video games
AGEod games
Computer wargames
Grand strategy video games
Multiplayer and single-player video games
Strategy First games
Turn-based tactics video games
Video games about the American Revolution
Video games developed in France
Video games with historical settings
War video games set in the United States
Windows games
Windows-only games